American Memorial School of Tabriz, established in the Iranian city of Tabriz in 1881 during the Qajar period, is one of the most prominent schools of its kind. Hundreds of Iranian received their secondary education in Memorial School. In 1935-1936 following the order of Reza Shah Pahlavi to nationalize all of the private schools, the school was renamed Parvin High School (دبیرستان پروین) by Iran's Ministry of Education. At present this school is divided into three separate secondary schools; however, the main original building still remains, as part of Parvin School.

Notable alumni
 Ahmad Kasravi
 Hasan Taqizadeh

AMST FC
Tabriz American Memorial School had a professional football team. AMST football team participated in the Iranian championship Cup four times and reached the final three times.

References

External links

See also
 Howard Baskerville
 Mansur High School

Educational institutions established in 1881
High schools in Iran
Schools in Tabriz
1881 establishments in Iran
Buildings of the Qajar period